Francis John Tanti (born 13 August 1949) is a former Australian politician.

Born in Adelaide, he became a cabinet-maker, eventually moving to Queensland. A member of the Liberal Party from August 1993, he ran unsuccessfully for Townsville City Council in 1994 and for the state seat of Mundingburra at the 1995 state election. He was North Queensland Liberal of the Year (1995–96) and worked on campaigns for the federal seat of Herbert before he won a by-election for Mundingburra on 3 February 1996. His win deprived the Labor government of its majority and led to the installation of Rob Borbidge of the National Party as Premier. Tanti sat in parliament until the 1998 state election, when he was defeated by the Labor candidate Lindsay Nelson-Carr.

References

1949 births
Living people
Members of the Queensland Legislative Assembly
Liberal Party of Australia members of the Parliament of Queensland
Politicians from Adelaide
People from Townsville
Australian cabinetmakers